Koundian is a village on the Niger River in the Kouroussa Prefecture in the Kankan Region of central Guinea.

External links
Satellite map

Populated places in the Kankan Region